Michael Köhler (born 26 February 1944) was an East German luger who competed in the late 1960s and early 1970s. He won two medals in the men's doubles event at the FIL World Luge Championships with a silver in 1970 and a bronze in 1969.

References
 Hickok sports information on World champions in luge and skeleton.

German male lugers
1944 births
Living people